Trupanea dacetoptera is a species of tephritid or fruit flies in the genus Trupanea of the family Tephritidae.

Distribution
Canada, United States, Bahamas, Puerto Rico, Saint Croix.

References

Tephritinae
Insects described in 1923
Diptera of North America